Herbie Mann with the Wessel Ilcken Trio (also released as Salute to the Flute) is an album by American jazz flautist Herbie Mann featuring tracks recorded in Holland in 1956 for the Epic label.

Reception

Allmusic awarded the album 2 stars.

Track listing
All compositions by Herbie Mann except as indicated
 "Lady Bach" - 2:16
 "Little Girl" (Madeline Hyde, Francis Henry) - 2:53
 "Imagination" (Jimmy Van Heusen, Johnny Burke) - 2:49
 "Love Is Here to Stay" (George Gershwin, Ira Gershwin) - 2:34
 "The Lady Is a Tramp" (Richard Rodgers, Lorenz Hart) - 2:59
 "Dear Old Stockholm" (Traditional) - 2:47
 "Falling in Love with Love" (Rodgers, Hart) - 2:48
 "Summertime" (George Gershwin, DuBose Heyward) - 4:23
 "Blues for Leila" - 6:13
 "Lover Come Back to Me" (Sigmund Romberg, Oscar Hammerstein II) - 3:29
 "Try a Little Tenderness" (Jimmy Campbell, Reg Connelly, Harry M. Woods) - 2:39
 "Afro Blues" - 2:14

Personnel 
Herbie Mann - flute, tenor saxophone
Ado Broodboom - trumpet (tracks 2, 4, 5 & 7)
Pim Jacobs - piano 
Ruud Jacobs - bass
Wessel Ilcken - drums

References 

1958 albums
Herbie Mann albums
Epic Records albums